Musart is an album by American saxophonist George Braith, his second and final effort for Prestige Records. It was recorded in 1966 and 1967, and released in mid 1967 as PRLP 7515.

The pieces
In the original liner notes, Braith describes the album as "a concert in miniature. Each tune was selected to relay a message of love, peace and tranquility." "Our Blessings" was inspired by Braith's brother, while "Evelyn Anita" was named after his sister,  Evelyn, and came to Braith's mind when he stopped to play "somewhere in the Southwest", on his way to Los Angeles. "Musart" and "Splashes of Love" were inspired by "beautiful sights as I crossed the United States." The latter "came to mind as I and Freddie Hubbard traveled from Los Angeles to a gig in San Francisco. We were hurrying to catch Trane's opening at the Workshop a day before ours at the Both-And. As Freddie took over the wheel of the car, I blew my soprano sax and a melody came to mind." "Del's Theme" is dedicated to disc jockey Del Shields.

Track listing
All compositions by George Braith except where noted
"Del's Theme" - 7:54
"Laura" (Raksin, Mercer) - 5:33
"Our Blessings" - 3:57
"Splashes of Love" - 2:47
"Musart" - 9:09
"Embraceable You" (Gershwin, Gershwin) - 5:05
"Evelyn Anita" - 7:11

Personnel
Tracks 3, 7
George Braith - soprano sax, C-melody sax
Jane Getz - piano
Jay Carter - guitar
Victor Davis - electric bass, organ
Ben Dixon (#3), Cal Lampley (#7) - drums
Victor Allende - congas
Adrienne Barbeau, Bunny Foy, Ellen Shashoyan - vocals

Tracks 1-2, 4-6
George Braith - soprano sax, alto sax, C-melody sax
Jane Getz - piano
Eddie Diehl - guitar
Bill Salter - bass
Angel Allende - drums, percussion
Unknown percussionists and voices

References 

Prestige Records albums
1967 albums
George Braith albums
Albums recorded at Van Gelder Studio
Albums produced by Cal Lampley